Epacris moscaliana, commonly known as seepage heath, is a species of flowering plant in the heath family Ericaceae and is endemic to Tasmania. It is a bushy shrub with wand-like branches, narrowly lance-shaped to egg-shaped or round leaves, and bell-shaped white flowers in clusters at the ends of the branches.

Description
The flowers are arranged in small clusters near the ends of branches with egg-shaped pinkish bracts at the base. The style and anthers extend well beyond the end of the tube.

Taxonomy and naming
Epacris moscaliana was first formally described in 1995 by R.K.Crowden in the journal Muelleria from specimens he collected in 2003 near the Dukes River in north-eastern Tasmania. The specific epithet (moscaliana) honours the plant collector, Tony Moscal.

Distribution and habitat
Seepage heath grows in marsh edges and on the edges of watercourses in north-eastern Tasmania.

Conservation status
Epacris moscaliana is listed as "rare" under the Tasmanian Government Threatened Species Protection Act 1995. The main threats to the species are land clearing and weed invasion, inappropriate fire regimes and disease caused by Phytophthora cinnamomi.

References

moscalina
Ericales of Australia
Flora of Tasmania
Plants described in 2007
Endemic flora of Australia